M=SF is a series of science fiction and fantasy novels published by the Dutch publisher Meulenhoff. The series started in 1967. It continued at the very least until 2013, when the number of books published per year was already reduced. Most titles in the series are translations from English language works, others are original Dutch language novels.

Books in the series 
(original Dutch language novels are in light orange)

External links 
  The complete list till 2010

Science fiction book series
Fantasy book publishers